James Stanley Mikol (June 11, 1938 – March 15, 2014) was a Canadian professional ice hockey player. A left winger and defenceman, he played 34 games in the National Hockey League (NHL) for the Toronto Maple Leafs and New York Rangers during the 1962–63 and 1964–65 seasons. The rest of his career, which lasted from 1958 to 1970, was sepnt in the minor leagues. He died in The Villages, Florida, in 2014.

Career statistics

Regular season and playoffs

References

External links
 

1938 births
2014 deaths
Canadian ice hockey defencemen
Canadian ice hockey left wingers
Cleveland Barons (1937–1973) players
Ice hockey people from Ontario
Johnstown Jets players
New York Rangers players
Ontario Hockey Association Senior A League (1890–1979) players
Peterborough Petes (ice hockey) players
Providence Reds players
St. Paul Rangers players
Sportspeople from Kitchener, Ontario
Toronto Maple Leafs players